Ivana, officially the Municipality of Ivana, is a 6th class municipality in the province of Batanes, Philippines.  According to the 2020 census, it has a population of 1,407 people.

History

Ivana is one of the three major pueblos of Batanes in the first half of the 19th century, alongside Basco and Marigatao. A mission was opened in the late 18th century with evangelization described as successful mainly due to the baptism of seven of the nine principals of Ivana.

In 1789, Joaquin del Castillo became the third governor of Batanes. Measures were put in place to ensure that all the natives including unbaptized ones respect and obey the law by means of obedience to the governor as king's representative. An uprising ensued led by a certain "evil and lawless man" named Chivunao of Ivana, who persuaded his chiefs to rebel against the government. His failed attempt prompted him to organize an uprising in Itbud where the Spaniards' cannons forced the rebels to surrender.

Geography

According to the Philippine Statistics Authority, the municipality has a land area of  constituting  of the  total area of Batanes.

Barangays
Ivana is politically subdivided into 4 barangays. These barangays are headed by elected officials: Barangay Captain, Barangay Council, whose members are called Barangay Councilors. All are elected every three years.

San Vicente was elevated into a barrio in 1955.

Climate

Demographics

In the 2020 census, Ivana had a population of 1,407.

Economy

Government
Ivana, belonging to the lone congressional district of the province of Batanes, is governed by a mayor designated as its local chief executive and by a municipal council as its legislative body in accordance with the Local Government Code. The mayor, vice mayor, and the councilors are elected directly by the people through an election which is being held every three years.

Elected officials

Education
The Schools Division of Batanes governs the town's public education system. The division office is a field office of the DepEd in Cagayan Valley region. The office governs the public and private elementary and public and private high schools throughout the municipality.

References

External links

 [ Philippine Standard Geographic Code]

Municipalities of Batanes